Jeff Hordley (born 7 March 1970) is an English actor, best known for portraying the role of Cain Dingle in the ITV soap opera, Emmerdale. For his portrayal of Cain, he has been nominated for the British Soap Award for Best Actor at three ceremonies.

Early and personal life
Hordley grew up in Oldham, Greater Manchester where he attended North Chadderton Comprehensive, before he went on to gain a BA (Hons) Theatre Arts (Acting) degree from Manchester Metropolitan University School of Theatre in 1997. In 1996, Hordley was diagnosed with Crohn's disease. He has experienced symptoms since the age of 20 and has been hospitalised three times from his condition. Hordley married his Emmerdale co-star Zoe Henry in 2003; the couple have two children: a daughter named Violet, born in 2005, and a son called Stan, born in April 2008. They also have 15 cats, 8 dogs and a large collection of pigeons.
He is a Manchester City fan.

Career
After making minor appearances in British soap opera including Coronation Street, Hordley was cast as Cain Dingle in the ITV soap opera Emmerdale in 2000. In 2006, he announced his decision to leave the soap in order to pursue other projects; the chance of a return was kept open by the producers. Later that year, he starred in a production of Mother Goose at the Churchill Theatre in Bromley. He later played Napoleon in the George Orwell classic Animal Farm at Leeds' West Yorkshire Playhouse in 2008, as well as the role of Mick in Harold Pinter's play The Caretaker when staged at Bolton's Octagon Theatre in 2009. In 2009, his return to Emmerdale was announced. Since his return, Hordley has been nominated for the British Soap Award for Best Actor three times.

Awards and nominations

References

External links
 

1970 births
20th-century English male actors
21st-century English male actors
English male soap opera actors
Alumni of Manchester Metropolitan University
People from Crumpsall
Male actors from Oldham
Living people
People educated at North Chadderton School
People with Crohn's disease
Male actors from Manchester